RCA Inspiration (formerly Verity Gospel Music Group) is a gospel music group operating under Sony Music.

History

Inception
In late 2002, BMG completed the purchase of the Zomba Group for US$2.74 billion and as a part of that deal, acquired the gospel label Verity Records.  In 2004, BMG purchased GospoCentric Records and its sublabel B'Rite Music, which already had ties with Zomba since before the purchase.  When BMG restructured the Zomba labels into the Zomba Label Group, those labels were initially moved there, however, in 2005, Zomba amalgamated its gospel interests in the new Zomba Gospel and operated it under the Zomba Label Group.  The new group consisted of Verity Records, GospoCentric Records and four artist owned imprints: Quiet Water Entertainment (Donald Lawrence), Fo Yo Soul Entertainment (Kirk Franklin), New Life Records (John P. Kee) and F. Hammond Music (Fred Hammond).  When BMG and Sony formed Sony BMG, Zomba Gospel (as a part of the Zomba Label Group) was shifted under the BMG Label Group as an amalgamation of BMG's interests in the merger.

Rebranding
In August 2008, Sony purchased Bertelsmann's half of their Sony BMG merger.  Since Bertelsmann kept the BMG name, Sony renamed the BMG Label Group to RCA/Jive Label Group in early 2009 and began the process of rebranding Zomba as the Jive Label Group.  In another move to eschew the Zomba name, Zomba Gospel was rebranded as Verity Gospel Music Group, taking its name from their flagship label.

Labels
Fo Yo Soul
GospoCentric Records
B-Rite Music
Quiet Water Entertainment
Verity Records

Awards
In May 2009, Verity Gospel made gospel music history being the first gospel label to hold the top four song positions on the R&R Gospel charts.  The songs were:
"Souled Out" - Hezekiah Walker & LFC
"Back II Eden" - Donald Lawrence & Co
"Praise Him In Advance" - Marvin Sapp
"Peace & Favor Rest On Us" - Kurt Carr & The Kurt Carr Singers

Artists
Per source
 Crystal Aikin
 Tamar Braxton
 Kurt Carr
 Latice Crawford
 Darnell Davis
 Dee-1
 Kirk Franklin
 Christon Gray
 The Greater Allen Cathedral 
 Travis Greene
 Deitrick Haddon
 Fred Hammond
 Israel Houghton
 Jahméne
 Le'Andria Johnson
 She'nice Johnson
 Deon Kipping
 Donnie McClurkin
 William Murphy
 Jason Nelson
 Tasha Page-Lockhart
 Marvin Sapp
 Richard Smallwood
 Hezekiah Walker
 The Walls Group

See also
List of record labels
Jive Label Group
Zomba Group of Companies

External links

References

Sony Music
Zomba Group of Companies subsidiaries